Le Poët is a commune in the Hautes-Alpes department in southeastern France.

Population

See also
Communes of the Hautes-Alpes department
Vexillology of Hautes-Alpes

References

Communes of Hautes-Alpes